The Paulet–Newcombe Agreement or Paulet-Newcombe Line, was a 1923 agreement between the British and French governments regarding the position and nature of the boundary between the Mandates of Palestine and Iraq, attributed to Great Britain, and the Mandate of Syria and Lebanon, attributed to France. The 1923 line defined the border of Mandatory Palestine from the Mediterranean up to Al-Hamma, Tiberias. The 1920 line defined, in less detail, the border of the French Mandate for Syria and Lebanon from the Mediterranean up to Jeziret-ibn-Omar.

The Agreement takes its name from the two Lieutenant colonels who were in charge of precisely mapping the border lines and drafting the Agreement, i.e. French Lieutenant colonel N. Paulet and British Lieutenant colonel S. F. Newcombe.

Together with a preliminary 1920 agreement, these are known as the Franco-British Boundary Agreements. The Iraq-Syria border was subsequently finalized in 1932 following a League of Nations commission review.

Today's Iraq–Syria border, Jordan–Syria border and Israel-Lebanon border, apart from the areas disputed as a result of Israel's conflicts with Lebanon and Syria, are defined by these agreements.

Sykes Picot and the Franco-Syrian War
The line separating the British and French spheres of interest in the area was first defined in the 1916 Sykes-Picot agreement. Britain's military occupied the region during the First World War, and in 1920 the French army invaded Syria. On 8 August 1920, during the Transjordan interregnum period, the French confirmed to the British that they would respect the Sykes-Picot line, and not move any military forces south.

December 1920 agreement

The boundary between the forthcoming British and French mandates was first defined in broad terms in the 1920 "Franco-British Convention on Certain Points Connected with the Mandates for Syria and the Lebanon, Palestine and Mesopotamia", signed in Paris by the British Ambassador to France, Charles Hardinge and the French Foreign Minister, Georges Leygues, on 23 December 1920. That agreement placed the bulk of the Golan Heights in the French sphere.

The treaty also established a joint commission to settle the precise details of the border and mark it on the ground.

The 1932 commission concluded that the 1920 agreement had been reached on the basis of the “British International 1:1,000,000 map published in 1916 and revised in 1918”, formally known as the Asia 1: 1,000,000. Projection of the International Map compiled at the Royal Geographical Society under the direction of the Geographical Section, General Staff. Drawn and printed at the War Office, 1916, today known as "GSGS 2555".

March 1923 agreement

The commission submitted its final report on 3 February 1922, which included a number of amendments. The amendments included:
 North East boundary moved westward (reducing the area of Palestine) to avoid splitting the lands of Emir Mahmud El-Fa’ur of  Quneitra
 Northern boundary moved northward (increasing the area of Palestine) to include the entire Sea of Galilee and the Yarmuk valley

It was approved with some caveats by the French and British governments on 7 March 1923, several months before Britain and France assumed their Mandatory responsibilities on 29 September 1923.

The agreements fixed the line of the Syrian-Palestinian border (now the Syrian-Israeli border) between the Mediterranean Sea and the town of Al-Hamma. The 1923 agreement takes its name from French Lieutenant Colonel N. Paulet and British Lieutenant Colonel S. F. Newcombe, who was appointed to lead the Boundary Commission.

1932 Iraq-Syria border commission
The League of Nations appointed a commission to review the Iraq-Syria border, ahead of the October 1932 accession of Iraq to the League of Nations. The commission carried out a detailed review of the 1920 agreement.

Gallery

See also
Seven Lebanese Villages
Shebaa farms

References

Bibliography
 
 John J. McTague Jr. (1982), Anglo-French Negotiations over the Boundaries of Palestine, 1919–1920, Journal of Palestine Studies, Vol. 11, No. 2. (Winter), pp. 100–12.
 Franco-British Convention on Certain Points Connected with the Mandates for Syria and the Lebanon, Palestine and Mesopotamia, signed Dec. 23, 1920. Text available in American Journal of International Law, Vol. 16, No. 3, Supplement, 1922, pp. 122–6.
 Agreement between His Majesty's Government and the French Government respecting the Boundary Line between Syria and Palestine from the Mediterranean to El Hámmé, Treaty Series No. 13 (1923), Cmd. 1910.
 Gideon Biger (1989), Geographical and other arguments in delimitation in the boundaries of British Palestine, in "International Boundaries and Boundary Conflict Resolution", IBRU Conference, pp. 41–61.
 Yitzhak Gil-Har (1993), British commitments to the Arabs and their application to the Palestine-Trans-Jordan boundary: The issue of the Semakh triangle, Middle Eastern Studies, Vol. 29, No. 4, pp. 690–701.
 Muhsin Yusuf (1991), The Zionists and the process of defining the borders of Palestine, 1915–1923, Journal of South Asian and Middle Eastern Studies, Vol. 15, No. 1, pp. 18–39.
 Gideon Biger (1995), The encyclopedia of international boundaries, New York: Facts on File.
 Gideon Biger (2005), The Boundaries of Modern Palestine, 1840-1947. London: Routledge. .
 US Department of State, International Boundary Study series:  Iraq-Jordan, Iraq-Syria, Jordan-Syria, Israel-Lebanon.

1923 in the United Kingdom
Treaties of the United Kingdom (1801–1922)
France–United Kingdom treaties
Borders of Israel
Borders of Lebanon
Borders of Syria
1923 in Iraq
1923 in Mandatory Syria
1920s in Lebanon
1923 in Mandatory Palestine
Boundary treaties
Interwar-period treaties
Treaties concluded in 1923
Treaties of the French Third Republic
Treaties extended to Mandatory Palestine
Treaties extended to Mandatory Iraq
Treaties extended to the French Mandate for Syria and the Lebanon
Israel–Lebanon border